Dejan Zukić (born 7 May 2001) is a Serbian footballer playing for Vojvodina. He usually operates as an attacking midfielder.

Club career

Vojvodina
Originating from Bački Jarak, Zukić came through the Vojvodina youth academy. On the tournament "Max sport cup" in 2014, Zukić promoted himself as the best scorer in his generation. 

Zukić joined the first team in summer 2017 at the age of 16, as the youngest member of the senior squad, signing a scholarship contract until summer 2019 previously. He was also elected among 13 players born 2001, which are licensed for the 2017–18 Serbian SuperLiga season. He noted his first time in protocol for senior match, staying on the bench as an unused substitution in the 3rd fixture game against OFK Bačka.

On 19 March 2019 Zukić signed his first professional contract, a three-year-deal with Vojvodina.

Only 11 days later, Zukić made his first team debut, replacing Damjan Gojkov in 88th minute, and drawing a penalty kick only a minute later, in 3:1 away win against Dinamo Vranje.

International career
Zukić was called into the national team selections since the age of 14. Later he was also called in Serbian under-15 team squad in 2015. Zukić made his debut for Serbia national under-16 football team in a match against Belarus on 2 April 2017. Playing for the team, Zukić made 6 appearances and scored 2 goals, in matches against Bulgaria and Estonia.

Career statistics

Club

Honours
Vojvodina
Serbian Cup: 2019–20

References

External links
 
 

2001 births
Living people
People from Bački Jarak
Association football midfielders
Serbian footballers
Serbia youth international footballers
FK Vojvodina players
Serbian SuperLiga players
Serbia under-21 international footballers